Spirit of Man is the fifth solo studio album by Bob Catley, released by Frontiers Records in 2006.

Track listing
 "Heart of Stone" (Dave Thompson, Paul Uttley, Vince O'Regan) — 5:23
 "Moment of Truth" (Dave Thompson, Paul Uttley) — 5:13
 "In The Name of the Cause" (Dave Thompson, Paul Uttley) — 4:45
 "Blinded by a Lie" (Vince O'Regan) — 4:57
 "Last Snows of Winter" (Dave Thompson, Paul Uttley) — 4:47
 "Spirit of Man" (Dave Thompson, Paul Uttley) — 6:23
 "The Fire Within Me" (Dave Thompson, Paul Uttley) — 5:04
 "Judgement Day" (Dave Thompson, Paul Uttley) — 4:24
 "Lost to the Night" (Vince O'Regan) — 4:19
 "Beautiful Mind" (Dave Thompson, Paul Uttley, Irvin Parratt) — 4:32
 "Walk on Water" (Vince O'Regan) — 7:47
 "End of the Story" (Dave Thompson, Paul Uttley, Irvin Parratt) — 4:24

Bonus Tracks on Japanese Release:
<LI> "Temptation" (Vince O'Regan) — 5:03

Personnel
Bob Catley — Vocals
Vince O'Regan — Guitar
Al Barrow — Bass
Jamie Little — Drums
Irvin Parratt — Keyboards
Dave Thompson — Rhythm Guitar

Production
Produced by Vince O'Regan and Bob Catley
Mixing by Vince O'Regan

References

External links
 www.bobcatley.com — Official Bob Catley site

Bob Catley albums
2006 albums
Frontiers Records albums